Prince Filiberto of Savoy, 4th Duke of Genoa (Filiberto Lodovico Massimiliano Emanuele Maria; 10 March 1895 – 7 September 1990) was the fourth Duke of Genoa and a member of the House of Savoy.

Born in Turin, Prince Filiberto was the second son of Prince Tommaso, Duke of Genoa and his wife Princess Isabella of Bavaria (1863–1924). On 22 September 1904 he was given the title Duke of Pistoia.

Prince Filiberto pursued a career in the Royal Italian Army achieving the rank of General. A supporter of Benito Mussolini, he volunteered to serve in the Second Italo-Abyssinian War where he commanded the 1st CC.NN. Division "23 Marzo". It was his division that raised the Italian flag over Amba Aradam. When Italy joined World War II, he became commander of the Italian 7th Army, but held no major commands after Italy joined the Allies.

Prince Filiberto married Princess Lydia of Arenberg (1 April 1905 in Brussels – 23 July 1977 in Lausanne) on 30 April 1928 in Turin. She was a daughter of Engelbert-Marie, 9th Duke of Arenberg, and Princess Hedwige of Ligne. They had no children.

After the Second World War a referendum was held in Italy where a majority of people voted to abolish the monarchy. With the death of his brother Ferdinando on 24 June 1963 he succeeded to the title Duke of Genoa.

Prince Filiberto died in Lausanne, Switzerland. His youngest brother Eugenio succeeded to the title Duke of Genoa.

Ancestry

References

1895 births
1990 deaths
Nobility from Turin
Dukes of Genoa
Italian princes
Burials at the Basilica of Superga
Military personnel from Turin